is a former Japanese football player.

Playing career
Nitta was born in Miyazaki Prefecture on May 11, 1980. After graduating from high school, he joined J1 League club Avispa Fukuoka in 1999. However he could hardly play in the match until 2002. In 2003, he moved to Regional Leagues club Shizuoka FC. In 2004, he moved to Regional Leagues club Okinawa Kariyushi FC. In 2005, he moved to Japan Football League club SC Tottori. He retired end of 2005 season.

Club statistics

References

External links

1980 births
Living people
Association football people from Miyazaki Prefecture
Japanese footballers
J1 League players
J2 League players
Japan Football League players
Avispa Fukuoka players
Gainare Tottori players
Association football defenders